Sir John de Soules (or de Soulis or Soules) (died 1310) was Guardian of Scotland from 1301 to 1304 in the Wars of Scottish Independence. He was a member of the de Soules family.

Life
John was the second son of William I de Soules and Ermengarde Durward. John had previously protected Galloway from Sir Andrew Harclay, Earl of Carlisle and Warden of the English March. He was appointed in 1292 as the custodian of Hugh Lovel. After the appointment of a Council of Twelve—in practice, a new panel of Guardians, by the leading men of Scotland, which sidelined King John Balliol in 1295, Soules was sent to France along with other envoys to negotiate an alliance. In 1301 after the resignations of Robert the Bruce and John Comyn he was appointed Guardian of Scotland. John was exiled and died in France in 1310.

Marriage and issue
He married Halwise Stewart, the daughter of Alexander Stewart, 4th High Steward of Scotland and Jean Macrory, they had the following known issue:
Muriel, married Richard Lovel, had issue.

Citations

References
McAndrew, Bruce A. Scotland's Historic Heraldry, Boydell Press, 2006. 
Peter Traquair Freedom's Sword

Guardians of Scotland
1310 deaths
Scoto-Normans
Year of birth unknown
Scottish people of the Wars of Scottish Independence